The Secretum or secret museum was a section of the British Museum created officially in 1865 to store all historical items deemed to be obscene.

History

Many items considered obscene were kept under key as early as 1830. One of the earliest artifacts was the Statue of Tara which was hidden for thirty years from the 1830s. The Secretum was officially created in 1865 to store all historical items deemed to be obscene. It is said to have been formally created in answer to the requirements of the Obscene Publications Act of 1857.

From the 1960s onwards, the artifacts were removed from this special collection and incorporated to the pertinent sections in the rooms open to the public, the book Recreations with the Muses, now  located in the Enlightenment Gallery is an example of this. Nowadays only a few items remain under key in the Cupboard 55 and 54 in the Department of Medieval and Later Antiquities. Among many other items, it previously contained the collection of ancient erotica given to the museum by George Witt (1804–1869), physician and collector of phallic antiquities. Inaccessible by the public, it was a repository for exhibits of an erotic nature.

A more recent example of problematic content is the Warren Cup which features scenes of homosexual acts. The cup was offered to the British Museum but because of the subject matter it was thought to be too contentious to purchase. The cup was eventually purchased at a much higher price and is now one of the museum's important artifacts.

See also 
 List of sex museums
 Private Case (British Museum)
 Secret Museum, Naples

References

Bibliography 
 
 

Sex museums
Sexuality in classical antiquity
Sexuality in the United Kingdom
Museums in popular culture
Collection of the British Museum